The Sikorsky S-6 was a Russian single engine experimental aircraft similar to the S-5, built in 1911 by Igor Sikorsky.

Design and development

Construction of the first S-6 was started in August 1911. The three bay biplane was powered by an Argus 4-cylinder water-cooled engine producing . Initial flight tests in late November were disappointing, revealing a long take-off run and poor climb performance. Sikorsky disassembled the aircraft and took it home where substantial modifications were undertaken, including lengthening the wingspan and reducing aerodynamic drag by enclosing the fuselage with wood veneer. Ailerons on the lower wing were removed and strut bracing wires were arranged in pairs with wooden spacers between them, further reducing drag.

Sikorsky now called the machine the S-6-A and it exhibited remarkable improvement.

In late spring 1912 Sikorsky began working at the Russian Baltic Railroad Car Works as chief engineer of the aircraft manufacturing division. Work was started on a refined version of the S-6-A called the S-6-B with strengthened landing gear and a mechanism to permit starting the engine from the cockpit. Completed in July, the S-6-B was entered in the international military competition at Saint Petersburg in August and flown by Sikorsky. At the end of the competition on 30 September the S-6-B was announced the winner leading to "an order for a few" more of the type.

Specifications (first aircraft)

References

S-036
Biplanes
Single-engined tractor aircraft
Russian civil aircraft
Aircraft first flown in 1911